Sectorseven is the third studio album by Sector Seven. It was released in 2002 by Sonic Unyon.

Track listing
 "Commit"
 "Stronghold"
 "Arizona"
 "Obvious"
 "Telling What"
 "Final"
 "Stand Alone"
 "962"
 "Halfman"
 "One Way"
 "Loose Ends"
 "Just Enough"

Personnel
Siegfried Meier - Engineer, mastering, mixing

External links
CHRW Radio

2002 albums
Sectorseven (band) albums
Albums produced by Siegfried Meier